The Avengers were a rock band from New Zealand. They were one of the country's most popular music groups of the 1960s along with The Fourmyula, and The Simple Image.

Singles

References

New Zealand rock music groups